Syrnola fasciata is a species of sea snail, a marine gastropod mollusk in the family Pyramidellidae, the pyrams and their allies.

Description
The length of the shell measures 4.5 mm. It shows two brownish cords on a whitish background on the body whorl

Distribution
This marine species occurs in the following locations:
 Indo-Pacific Region
 European waters (ERMS scope)
 Mediterranean Sea : off Cyprus and Israel.
 Aegean Sea off Greece and Turkey (as an introduced species)
 Mersin Bay

References
Notes

Bibliography
 Gastropods.com:  Syrnola fasciata: retrieved: 21 February 2012

External links
 To CLEMAM
 To Encyclopedia of Life
 To World Register of Marine Species
 

Pyramidellidae
Gastropods described in 1882